Owd Bob (or Bob, Son of Battle) is an 1898 novel by Alfred Ollivant.

Owd Bob may also refer to:

 Owd Bob (1924 film), a British film adaptation
 Owd Bob (1938 film), a British film adaptation
 Owd Bob (1998 film), a British-Canadian film adaptation

See also
 Thunder in the Valley (film), a 1947 American film adaptation
 Old Bob, a 19th-century driving horse